Edward Ward may refer to:

Sir Edward Ward, 1st Baronet, of Bixley (c. 1618–1684), Sheriff of Norfolk, dubbed knight by Cromwell (1657), baronetcy granted by Charles II (1660)
Edward Ward, 7th Baron Dudley (1631–1701)
Edward Ward, 8th Baron Dudley (1683–1704)
Edward Ward, 9th Baron Dudley (1704–1731), English peer
Edward Ward, 4th Viscount Bangor (1827–1881), Irish representative peer
Sir Edward Ward, 1st Baronet, of Wilbraham Place (1853–1928), British army officer, notable reformer of army administration
Edward Ward, 7th Viscount Bangor (1905–1993), Anglo-Irish war correspondent and author
Edward Ward (composer) (1900–1971), American film score composer, nominated for seven Oscars between 1939-44
Edward Ward (cricketer) (1847–1940), English clergyman and cricketer
Edward Ward (footballer) (1895–1971), association football inside forward active in the 1920s
Edward Ward (judge) (1638–1714), English lawyer and judge
Edward Ward (politician) (1753–1812), Irish MP for Bangor and Down
Edward Ward (rugby league) (fl. 1940s–1950s), rugby league footballer for Great Britain, and Bradford Northern
Edward Ward (umpire) (1896–1966), West Indian cricket umpire
Edward Matthew Ward (1816–1879), English Victorian narrative painter
Edward Michael Ward (1789–1832), British envoy to Portugal, Russia and Saxony
Edward Wolstenholme Ward (1823–1890), British major-general in the Royal Engineers, Member of the New South Wales Legislative Council
Eddie Ward (1899–1963), Australian politician

See also
Ned Ward (1667–1731), British satirical writer
Ted Ward (fl. 1930s–1950s), rugby league footballer and then coach for Great Britain, Wales, Wigan and Cardiff RLFC
Ed Ward (disambiguation)